A Waldorf salad is a fruit and nut salad generally made of celery, fresh apples, walnuts, and grapes, dressed in mayonnaise, and traditionally served on a bed of lettuce as an appetizer or a light meal. The apples, celery, and grapes can all be green, which harmonizes the color palette of the dish.

History 
Waldorf salad is named for the Waldorf-Astoria hotel in New York City, where it was first created for a charity ball given in honor of the St. Mary's Hospital for Children on March 13, 1896. The Waldorf-Astoria's maître d'hôtel, Oscar Tschirky, developed or inspired many of the hotel's signature dishes and is widely credited with creating the salad recipe. In 1896, the salad appeared in The Cook Book by "Oscar of the Waldorf".

The original recipe was just apples, celery, and mayonnaise. It did not contain nuts, but they had been added by the time the recipe appeared in The Rector Cook Book in 1928.

Modern versions 
Other ingredients such as chicken, turkey, and dried fruit (e.g. dates or raisins) are sometimes added. Updated versions of the salad sometimes change the dressing to a seasoned mayonnaise or a yogurt dressing. Modern Waldorf salad may also include the zest of oranges and/or lemons. Variations include a peanut butter and yogurt base, and one that replaces celery with cauliflower.

See also
 Fruit salad
 List of fruit dishes
 List of regional dishes of the United States
 List of salads
 Fawlty Towers

References

Cuisine of New York City
Fruit salads
Vegetable dishes
Waldorf Astoria New York
Walnut dishes
American salads